China–India Railway or Sino Indian Railway (Chinese: 中印铁路) are a number of planned railways between China and India:

 Most advanced in plans, technically not entering India but still bearing the name, 460 km standard gauge 120-160 km/h railway to link Yadong on Indo-Chinese border with current railhead Shigatse Railway Station, Tibet, and possibly onward with break of gauge (broad gauge) and continuing to Sikkim and beyond, pending politics. Land ports and trans-shipment is more likely. This line may share a good part of its routing with China-Nepal railway towards Gyirong and Kathmandu. Following 2020 China–India skirmishes, China seems keen to hasten Tibet rail projects. The Indian government is constructing a rail link which is planned to be extended up to the border at Nathu La (Sivok–Rangpo line).
 Another different (conventional) line would begin in Kunming, through Ruili, Myitkyina, and end in Ledo, India, final construction on 160 km/h standard gauge line toward Ruili Station is finishing up, this u/c section of it is called Dali–Ruili railway, while international points beyond on this routing have yet to commit. Myanmar has expressed interest to extend Ruili route to Mandalay in its place, all points beyond pending.
 Farther fetched proposals for high speed trains between China and India have been floated as generic abstract concepts without feasibility study.

See also 

 China–Nepal railway
 Sivok–Rangpo line
 Indian geostrategic rail lines
 Sichuan–Tibet railway (Lhasa–Nyingchi railway) - passes within 50km of border with India
 India–China Border Roads

References

Rail transport in China
Rail transport in Tibet
Mountain railways
China–India relations